Pachybrachis is a genus of scriptured leaf beetles in the family Chrysomelidae. There are at least 220 described species in Pachybrachis.

See also
 List of Pachybrachis species

References

Further reading

External links

 
 

 
Cryptocephalinae
Chrysomelidae genera
Taxa named by Louis Alexandre Auguste Chevrolat